Sura rufitibia is a moth of the family Sesiidae. It is known from Nigeria.

References

Endemic fauna of Nigeria
Sesiidae
Insects of West Africa
Moths of Africa
Moths described in 1919